Mariana Paraschiv (born 28 November 1962) is a Romanian butterfly and medley swimmer. She competed in three events at the 1980 Summer Olympics.

References

External links
 

1962 births
Living people
Romanian female butterfly swimmers
Romanian female medley swimmers
Olympic swimmers of Romania
Swimmers at the 1980 Summer Olympics
Sportspeople from Bucharest
Universiade medalists in swimming
Universiade silver medalists for Romania